Spaceship Warlock is an adventure game created by Mike Saenz and Joe Sparks. The game was released in 1991 for the Macintosh and in 1994 for Windows.

The game was a first person adventure set in a sci-fi future. The player explores and interacts the game universe by clicking. Limited manipulation of objects is needed and there are several optional locations and things the player can explore or discover besides following the linear narrative. Dialogues involve typing a topic to a character such as "whiskey", "Terra" or "pirates". Some arcade sequences enrich the gameplay.

Spaceship Warlock was one of the earliest and best-known multimedia CD-ROM games to combine all original animation, story, music, and game play. The game menu refers to itself as a movie. Graphically ahead of its time and acquired a cult following. Spaceship Warlock is widely considered a pioneering work, and it received many awards and honors, including the "Game of the Year" award from Macworld magazine.

Some of the game's outer space scenes are reminiscent of the art of Chesley Bonestell.

Plot 
The game is set after the end of the "Terran Empire". Terra has lost a millennial war against the Kroll, who then used a planetary technology to move Terra out of its orbit and move the planet to an unknown location deep in Kroll space. Humans now have no homeworld and some have ended up as space pirates.

The game features an unnamed protagonist starting in a dark alley in Stambul city. No details are given about the player character other that he is a "Terrie" (human). At first, the player can explore some streets of Stambul City but there not much to do as the player character has no money. However, after incapacitating an alien mugger, he is awarded several thousand credits by the police force, with which he can buy a ticket out of Stambul.

The player can afford a ticket to the luxurious cruise spaceship Belshazzar. As the player interacts with "Captain Starbird" and his daughter "Stella" the ship is attacked by the "Spaceship Warlock". The pirates led by Captain Hammer, an eyepatch-wearing space pirate and revolutionary leader (aesthetically a blatant nod to Nick Fury) board the ship and apprehend the passengers. In the brig, Hammer invites the player to his crew.

The player then goes on to battle and ultimately overthrow the evil Kroll empire and restore freedom to the galaxy.

Lawsuit 
The game's creators were involved in a legal dispute over the copyright:

Reception
Spaceship Warlock was a commercial success on the Mac. Inside Mac Games reported in April 1993, "Warlock has sold over 20,000 copies and is currently the best-selling CD-ROM title on the Macintosh."

Computer Gaming World in 1992 reported that the game's "interactive movie experience is close enough that we hear credible reports of Macintosh users buying CD-ROM players just to be able to run Warlock". The magazine praised the game's graphics and sound, stating that "there is a good reason why [it] is among the top-selling CD-ROM titles of any genre". While noting the long load times and "spongy, wobbly" combat interface, it wrote that "The richly rendered scenes, objects and character that one searches, opens, pilots, converses with or fights against ... can convey the sensation of another reality". In 1993 the magazine called it "still one of the best" Macintosh CD-ROM products.

References

External links
 

1991 video games
Adventure games
Classic Mac OS games
Interactive movie video games
Science fiction video games
ScummVM-supported games
Single-player video games
Video games developed in the United States
Windows games